This is a list of the members of the 16th Seanad Éireann, the upper house of the Oireachtas (legislature) of Ireland. These Senators were elected or appointed in 1982, after the February 1982 general election and served until the close of poll for the 17th Seanad in 1983.

Composition of the 16th Seanad 
There are a total of 60 seats in the Seanad. 43 Senators are elected by the Vocational panels, 6 elected by the Universities and 11 are nominated by the Taoiseach.

The following table shows the composition by party when the 16th Seanad first met on 13 May 1982.

List of senators

Changes

See also 
Members of the 23rd Dáil
Government of the 23rd Dáil

References

External links 

 
16